Jermaine Brown may refer to:

 Jermaine Brown (athlete) (born 1991), Jamaican sprinter
 Jermaine Brown (footballer, born 1983), English football midfielder
 Jermaine Brown (footballer, born 1985), Caymanian football goalkeeper
 Jermaine Brown, 1991 Kentucky Mr. Basketball and basketball player at the University of Kentucky